Za humny je drak is a 1982 Czechoslovak film. The film starred Josef Kemr.

Plot
The film is about a dragon called Mrak. King Jan is scared of him even though Mrak is not evil and even befriends a girl Lidka.

References

External links
 

1982 films
Czechoslovak fantasy films
1980s Czech-language films
Czech fantasy films
Films about dragons
1980s Czech films